Jean Toutin (1578 – June 14, 1644) was a French enamelworker who was one of the first artists to make enamel portrait miniatures. His technique was used by Jean Petitot and his son Jean Louis Petitot, as well as by Pierre Signac and Charles Boit.

External links
Biography in Encyclopædia Britannica

16th-century French painters
French male painters
17th-century French painters
1578 births
People from Eure-et-Loir
1644 deaths
French enamellers
16th-century enamellers
17th-century enamellers